Jabari Issa (born April 18, 1978) was a defensive lineman at the University of Washington, drafted in the 2000 NFL Draft by the Arizona Cardinals where he played from 2000-2001. Issa's career also included NFL stints with the Houston Texans (taken in the 2002 NFL Expansion Draft), Pittsburgh, and Kansas City, the NFL Europe Barcelona Dragons, and the CFL including a Grey Cup Championship with the Edmonton Eskimos.

High school
Issa attended San Mateo High School in San Mateo, California where he was an All-Peninsula Athletic League and All-Bay Area pick as a senior.

College
Issa played for the Washington Huskies from 1996 to 1999 for coaches Jim Lambright and Rick Neuheisel.  In 1998, he registered an All-Pac-10 campaign.  In 1999, he served as a team captain.
Following his Washington career, Issa played in the East–West Shrine Game.

References

1978 births
Living people
American football defensive ends
American football defensive tackles
Canadian football defensive linemen
Washington Huskies football players
Arizona Cardinals players
Houston Texans players
Pittsburgh Steelers players
Kansas City Chiefs players
Edmonton Elks players
Winnipeg Blue Bombers players
Barcelona Dragons players